"" (In You Is Joy) is a German hymn with text attributed to Cyriacus Schneegaß, written to a 1591 dance song melody by Giovanni Giacomo Gastoldi. It was first published in a collection of Christmas carols in Erfurt in 1594, and then published again in 1598. Johann Sebastian Bach composed a chorale prelude, BWV 615, as part of his Orgelbüchlein. The song is part of the common Protestant hymnal Evangelisches Gesangbuch, and of many hymnals and songbooks, including ecumenical collections. It was translated by Catherine Winkworth as "In Thee Is Gladness".

History 

The text of "" is written to a secular melody. The tune by Giovanni Giacomo Gastoldi was first published in 1591, for an Italian dancing song, "A lieta vita amor ci invita" (Amor invites to a merry life) that has elements of song for entertainment. The text and melody of "" first appeared in Erfurt in Johann Lindemann's 1594 collection of 20 Christmas carols. Lindemann published them in Erfurt in 1598. While the text was first attributed to Lindemann, it is unclear if he wrote any hymns, and it became later rather attributed to Cyriacus Schneegaß.

It is contained in the modern Protestant hymnal Evangelisches Gesangbuch as EG 389, and is part of many hymnals and songbooks, including ecumenical collections.

Text 
The text is in two stanzas of 16 short lines. Most lines have five syllables in always the same rhythm. Lines 3, 6, 11 and 16 are longer and rhyme, in an AAB CCB DDEEF GGHHF rhyme scheme. Lines 11 and 16 of each stanza end on "Halleluja".

The text is based on Bible verses including  Psalm 30:11–12 and Romans 8:38–39. The singer addresses Jesus as the source of joy in all distress.

The hymn was translated by Catherine Winkworth as "In Thee Is Gladness" for the second edition of her Lyra Germanica (1858). It is part of the Lutheran Service Book, among other modern hymnals.

Melody and music 

Gastoldi's melody has been described as perfectly matching its expression of joy in the first line with its consolation of trust in Jesus during hard times.

Johann Sebastian Bach composed a festive organ chorale prelude, BWV 615, as part of his Orgelbüchlein dating from his period at Weimar; the complete cantus firmus is gradually heard in canon, over a carillon-like ostinato pedal. The chorale prelude featured in the 2019 CD "Bach to the future" of Olivier Latry, principal organist at Notre-Dame de Paris, recorded shortly before the devastating fire in the cathedral.

References

External links 

 
 "In dir ist Freude", (preceded by organ prelude from Bach's Orgelbüchlein), sung by the Thomanerchor Leipzig

17th-century hymns in German
1641 works
Lutheran hymns